= Facies anterior =

Facies anterior or anterior surface may refer to:

- Anterior surface of pancreas (facies anterior corporis pancreatis)
- Anterior surface of the body of maxilla (facies anterior corporis maxillae)
- Anterior surface the heart (facies anterior cordis)
